It was a Dacian fortified town.

References

External links
 Cetatea geto-dacică de la Sprâncenata va prinde viaţă din nou

Dacian fortresses in Olt County
Historic monuments in Olt County